Raymond Ford (born March 16, 1999) is an American professional boxer. As an amateur he won the 2018 U.S. National Golden Gloves Championships.

Professional career
Ford made his professional debut on March 15, 2019, scoring a four-round unanimous decision (UD) victory over Weusi Johnson at the Liacouras Center in Philadelphia, Pennsylvania. The fight was part of the undercard for Tevin Farmer's world title defense against Jono Carroll. He had four more wins in 2019; a four-round points decision (PTS) over Aleksandrs Birkenbergs in May; a first-round knockout (KO) over Isidro Figueroa in June; and a four-round UD over Rafael Castillo in September. Ford closed out 2019 with a first-round technical knockout of Francisco Muro on December 20, 2019.

Ford began his 2020 campaign by facing Eric Manriquez on August 15, 2020. He won the fight by unanimous decision. Ford next faced Rafael Reyes on November 7, 2020. He won the fight by a third-round technical knockout. Ford fought Juan Antonio López on December 19, 2020, in his final fight of the year. He won the bout by a seventh-round knockout.

Ford was booked to face the undefeated Aaron Perez on March 13, 2021, on the undercard of the Juan Francisco Estrada-Roman Gonzalez rematch. The fight ended in a split draw. One judge scored the fight 77–75 for Ford, the second judge scored it 78–74 for Perez, while the last judge scored the bout as even 76–76 draw. Ford was displeased with his performance, and asked for a rematch on his Instagram page, writing: "I definitely want a rematch to clean this up and show everyone I’m a better fighter than how I performed".

Ford was scheduled to fight Reece Bellotti for the vacant WBA Continental featherweight title on August 14, 2021. The fight was Ford's first fight outside of the United States, as it took place at the Matchroom Headquarters in Brentwood, England. He won the fight by a third-round technical knockout. Ford made his first title defense against Felix Caraballo on November 27, 2021. He retained the title with an eight-round technical knockout of Caraballo. Ford was scheduled to make his second title defense against the undefeated Edward Vazquez on February 5, 2022. Ford won the fight by split decision. Two of the judges scored the fight 98-92 and 97-93 in his favor, while the third judge scored the bout 96-94 for Vazquez.

Ford was booked to make his first Continental Americas title defense in a regional title unification bout with the undefeated  IBF North American featherweight titlist Richard Medina on June 25, 2022. He won the fight by unanimous decision, with two scorecards of 100–90 and one scorecard of 99–91. Ford made his second WBA Continental Americas featherweight title defense against Sakaria Lukas on November 12, 2022. He won the fight by an eight-round knockout.

Ford made his sixth WBA Continental Americas title defense against the former WBO junior featherweight champion Jessie Magdaleno on April 8, 2023.

Professional boxing record

References

Living people
1999 births
American male boxers
Boxers from Philadelphia
Super-featherweight boxers
National Golden Gloves champions